Lily Eskelsen García (née Pace; born May 1, 1955) is an American teacher and labor union leader.  As president of the 3 million-member National Education Association, she led the largest union in the United States from 2014 to 2020.

Early life and education
Lily Eskelsen García was born Lilia Laura Pace on May 1, 1955, in Fort Hood, Texas. Her father was in the United States Army.  Her mother is from Panama. After high school, she married Ruel Eskelsen, with whom she had two children before his death on March 18, 2011. Eskelsen García began her career as a cafeteria worker, and then as an aide to a special education teacher.  At this teacher's suggestion, she went back to school to pursue a teaching degree. She worked her way through the University of Utah on scholarships, student loans, and as a starving folk singer, graduating magna cum laude in elementary education and later earning her master's degree in instructional technology.

Teaching
In 1980, Eskelsen García went to work teaching fourth, fifth, and sixth grades at Orchard Elementary in the Granite School District in Utah. In 1989, she was named Utah Teacher of the Year. 
Later, while in union leadership positions, she taught homeless children in a single classroom at Salt Lake City's homeless Shelter, and the Christmas Box House Children's Shelter, a kindergarten through 6th grade one-room public school serving hard-to-place foster children in Salt Lake City.

Labor leadership
The press coverage she received as a result of the Teacher of the Year award encouraged her to run for office, and in 1990 she won a write-in election as president of the Utah Education Association, an affiliate of the National Education Association (NEA). One of her initiatives as president was to organize the Children at Risk Foundation; she served as its first president. She also served as president of Utah Retirement Systems.

In 1996, she was elected to the NEA Executive Committee. In 2002, she was elected NEA Secretary-Treasurer with 78 percent of the vote, the first time a four-candidate race was decided on the first ballot. She served two three-year terms as treasurer, under NEA president Reg Weaver. On July 4, 2008, she was elected NEA vice-president, and she was re-elected at the 2011 NEA Representative Assembly with over 90% of the vote. At the 2014 NEA Representative Assembly in Denver, Colorado, she was elected NEA President and served as NEA President until September 1, 2020, when she was succeeded by Becky Pringle.

Eskelsen García is a national leader among Hispanic educators; she addressed the Congressional Hispanic Caucus Institute Public Policy Conference in September 2008. Her education advice for parents has been published in Time, Working Mother, and Woman's World, and she has been featured on Fox News's Hannity & Colmes and CNN's Lou Dobbs Tonight. She has been the invited keynote speaker for hundreds of education events across the United States and was highlighted by Education World in their "Best Conference Speakers" edition. She writes a blog, "Lily's Blackboard," covering the latest education issues.

Her union leadership has included writing protest songs, such as one about the No Child Left Behind Act. As vice president, she has been part of NEA's recent emphasis on working with the American labor movement; she appeared in Washington, D.C. on December 10, 2009, with labor leaders from the Teamsters and the AFL-CIO to speak out against taxing health-care benefits, where she said, "We should tax the millionaires, not teachers and bus drivers."

Personal life
She was married to Ruel Eskelsen, who died in 2011. She is currently married to graphic artist Alberto Garcia with whom she published the 2014 book, Rabble Rousers: Fearless Fighters for Social Justice.

Politics and controversy
In 1998, she was the first Hispanic person to be chosen as the Democratic Party's nominee for a U.S. Congressional seat in Utah, raising almost $1 million, and receiving 45% of the vote, ultimately losing to incumbent Merrill Cook in the general election.
In 2000, she served as a member of President Bill Clinton's White House Strategy Session on Improving Hispanic Education, and in 2011, President Obama named her a member of the President's Advisory Commission on Educational Excellence for Hispanics.

In November 2015, Eskelsen Garcia received backlash for comments she made during the Campaign for America's Future Awards Gala. During a speech, she said, "We diversify our curriculum instruction to meet the personal individual needs of all of our students, the blind, the hearing impaired, the physically challenged, the gifted and talented, the chronically tarded and the medically annoying." Several organizations, including the American Association of People with Disabilities and National Down Syndrome Society, called on her to apologize and asked for more open dialogue regarding students with disabilities. Eskelsen Garcia apologized on her blog, saying she had misspoken while trying to be funny - she had meant to say "chronically tardy", and by "medically annoying" she had meant those who use their own problems to purposefully disrupt class and the teacher, rather than those with medical issues.

In 2016, Eskelsen Garcia campaigned for Hillary Clinton. She spoke at the 2016 Democratic National Convention.

After the inauguration of Donald Trump, she described him and the nominee for Secretary of Education Betsy DeVos as having an agenda to "profitize, privatize and ... throw a middle-class child into the street saying, 'Let them eat for-profit vouchers.'". More than 1 million emails opposing DeVos' nomination were generated through NEA's online form. Eskelsen Garcia continued to oppose the administration's budget priorities in 2018, calling the proposed 13.5% cut in education spending a "wrecking ball" aimed at public schools.

In 2020, Eskelsen Garcia was instrumental in securing an endorsement by the NEA for 2020 presidential candidate Joe Biden in the primary and general elections. However, some union members stated their voices weren't heard, as "the rank and file were not asked who they wanted to support". Joe Biden's goal for education has been described as "support[ing] teachers, but that's about as far as his plan goes" and that there is "no real structural plan".

In 2020, García was named a candidate for Secretary of Education in the Biden Administration, but Connecticut education commissioner Miguel Cardona was chosen instead. She is reported to have a close working relationship with incoming First Lady Jill Biden, fellow NEA member and educator.

References

External links

1955 births
Living people
People from Fort Hood, Texas
People from Salt Lake City
University of Utah alumni
Presidents of the National Education Association
American trade union leaders
Schoolteachers from Utah
American women educators
American people of Panamanian descent
Trade unionists from Texas
People from North Salt Lake, Utah
Candidates in the 1998 United States elections
Utah Democrats
20th-century American women
21st-century American women